Aitrang is a municipality in the district of Ostallgäu in Bavaria in Germany.

Geography 
Aitrang lies in the south Bavarian Region Allgäu. 
 
It encompasses districts of: Aitrang, Huttenwang, Wenglingen. Administrative responsibility also extends to the outlying villages of Binnings, Goerwangs, Krähberg, Neuenried, Wolfholz, Münzenried and Umwangs as well as several Farms. The district also covers the Eibsee (lake).

History 
Earliest written record of Aitrang can be found in the records of the King of the Franken Pepin the Short (741-768) where the village is mentioned. The village was considered the property of the Reichsvogtei (Abbot's Residence) and St. Mang's Abbey, Füssen, and from 1227 was signed over and charged to the Lower Court Authority. The Reichsvogtei had been confiscated many times due to debts, and finally was sold in 1524 to the Fürststift Kempten. For a time leading up to the year 1803 the rights over the village were divided between the Town of Kempten (to the west) and Abby of St. Mang in Füssen to the south. In 1803 the village was finally assigned to the Duke (Fürsten|Fürst) of Oettingen-Wallerstein. In 1806 a further change took place when the region was succeeded as part of the Rheinbundakte to the state of Bavaria. As part of the reform of Bavarian Administration in 1818 the village took on the legal form which prevailed through to 1978 when the sub-districts of Huttenwang, Hamlet of Neuenried, Umwangs and Wolfholz were merged into Aitrang. In 1982 the Hamlet of Wenglingen (previously part of Apfeltrang near Kaufbeuren) was adopted after a local referendum.

Population Growth 
In the modern boundaries of the Political border of the village, the growth is as follows  
1970 Aitrang had 1,632 residents, 1987 it had 1,757 and in 2000 1.942.

Religion 

The majority of the residents of Aitrang are Catholics, however there are also a small number of the Protestant faith. The only church in the village itself is the church of Ulrich, named after the Beneficiary of Augsburg. The congregation is served by the vicar Maximilian Hieble, who is also responsible for conducting services the community of Huttenwang. In Wenglingen there is also a chapel called Rosinakapelle. In Görwangs there is the (on a hill to the north and overlooking the village) the small but beautifully decorated Pilgrims church of St. Alban.

Politics 
The town mayor is Michael Hailand, elected in March 2020.
 
In 1999 the community taxes raised were in the region of 900,000 Euros, In these there was Business taxes of some 224,000 Euros.

Crest 
The Village crest is a "vertically split shield; left side horizontally divided into Red and Blue, the right side is silver (or white on paper) with a vertical Abbots staff encompassed by two Blue Bows (without arrows)."

Business and Infrastructure

Business and Farm- and Forestry 
In the business sector of Farm and Forestry there were six players in 1998 with 193 production staff, in trade and transport 20 regular employees.  In other trades there was 79 employees active.  In the Village the number of gainfully employed persons is 595 in total. In the processing industry there are no businesses, In the building and Construction there are six. Additionally in 1999 there were some 93 Farms with a total of 5,372 Arces. Most of this is maintained as Grassland.

Education 
In 1999 there was:
a Kindergärten with maximum 72 places, but only 60 children attending
a Primary school with 11 teachers and 187 students

Major rail accident
9 February 1971 – During the inter city journey of the Trans-Europ Express (TEE) 56 Bavaria from Munich Hbf to Zürich HB a serious accident occurred with the loss of 28 lives. A further 42 were injured. The train was formed of an SBB-CFF-FFS RAm TEE I four-car diesel train with the driving trailer leading, and with the power car pushing from the rear. After passing the small station "Aitrang" (where the TEE did not need to stop) the train continued into a very sharp curve in a narrow gorge between two hills at a speed of approximately  where a maximum speed of only  was permitted.  It subsequently derailed and uprooted both its own tracks as well as the oncoming tracks before four-car train rolled down the dip into the stream and road that also shared the same path through the hills. A short while later and before anyone could prevent it, a pair of Uerdingen railbuses coming from Kempten came around the bend and into the debris of the crashed train. It was later discovered that the driver of the TEE train was unable to slow the train down due to condensed water collecting in the hoses between the locomotive and all the wagons freezing and blocking the air brake system. He had only electric operated brakes on the locomotive to rely on, and these evidently were unable to slow the train enough for the sharp curve. See Eisenbahnunfall von Aitrang on German Wikipedia for more details.

Picture Gallery

References

External links 

 Website of the municipality Aitrang
 Warburg Institute Iconographic Database (images of the interior of St Alban's church)

Ostallgäu